Longny-au-Perche is a former commune in the Orne department in north-western France. On 1 January 2016, it was merged into the new commune of Longny les Villages.

Heraldry

See also
Communes of the Orne department
 Perche

References

Longnyauperche
Perche